Ghost of a Dog is the second album by American alternative rock band Edie Brickell & New Bohemians, released in 1990.

In the printed lyrics that accompany the album, each song has a word with a single letter missing.  In order, they spell out "ghost of a dog." 

The album sold about 500,000 copies. After a tour in support of the album, the band decided to take an indefinite hiatus.

Production
The album was produced by Tony Berg.  Unlike on the debut, where many tracks used session musicians, the New Bohemians play throughout Ghost of a Dog.

Critical reception
The Los Angeles Times thought that "Brickell and the Bohemians band do a reasonable job of recycling the soothing elements of ‘60s pop-folk, but her own views are so childlike and her images so often pointless that it’s hard to work up any feeling for them." Entertainment Weekly wrote: "Brickell can write lyrically about the difference between the desire for romantic independence and desire itself. But just when she starts to show some grit, she’ll drift toward smiley-faced ditties like 'Oak Cliff Bra' — songs so cloying they make you wonder if Brickell underwent a lobotomy between tracks." The New York Times declared that none of the songs recaptured the charm of the first album's "What I Am". The Chicago Tribune wrote that Brickell's "ability to write wisely about the bad stuff of romance with a marked lack of anger toward the opposite sex makes her unique and-for postmodern romantics-endearing."

Track listing

Personnel 
The New Bohemians
 Edie Brickell – vocals, acoustic guitar
 Kenny Withrow – acoustic guitar, electric guitar, dobro, slide guitar, backing vocals
 Wes Burt-Martin – acoustic guitar, electric guitar, backing vocals, string arrangements (9)
 Brad Houser – bass 
 Matt Chamberlain – drums
 John Bush – percussion

Additional musicians
 Tony Berg – keyboards, guitars, string arrangements (9)
 Paul Fox – keyboards
 Danny Timms – acoustic piano (1)
 Jo-El Sonnier – accordion (3)
 Paul "Wix" Wickens – keyboards (8)
 David Mansfield – acoustic guitar (8)
 Larry Corbett – cello (9)
 Novi Novog – viola (9)
 Sid Page – violin (9)
 John Lydon – backing vocals (8)

Production 
 Tony Berg – producer, mixing (5, 14)
 Chris Lord-Alge – recording 
 Susan Rogers – recording, mixing (7, 12)
 David Thoener – recording 
 Ken Jordan – additional recording 
 Greg Goldman – assistant engineer 
 Mike Reiter – assistant engineer 
 Bob Clearmountain – mixing (1-4, 6, 8-11, 13)
 George Marino – mastering
 Robin Sloane – creative director 
 Lyn Bradley – design, layout 
 Janet Wolsborn – design, layout 
 Ann Cutting – photographic tinting

Studios
 Recorded at Bearsville Studios (Bearsville, New York); The Village Recorder and Zeitgeist Studios (Los Angeles, California).
 Mixed at A&M Studios (Hollywood, California).
 Mastered at Sterling Sound (New York City, New York).

Charts
Album - Billboard (United States)

Singles - Billboard (United States)

Notes 

Edie Brickell & New Bohemians albums
1990 albums
Albums produced by Tony Berg
Geffen Records albums